Na Khu is a district (amphoe) in the eastern part of Kalasin province, northeastern Thailand.

Geography
Neighboring districts are (from the south clockwise): Khao Wong, Kuchinarai, and Huai Phueng of Kalasin Province; Phu Phan and Tao Ngoi of Sakon Nakhon province; and Dong Luang of Mukdahan province.

History
The minor district (king amphoe) was created on 1 April 1995, when it was split off from Khao Wong district.

On 15 May 2007, all 81 minor districts were upgraded to full districts. With publication in the Royal Gazette on 24 August, the upgrade became official.

Administration
The district is divided into five sub-districts (tambons), which are further subdivided into 54 villages (mubans). Na Khu is a township (thesaban tambon) which covers parts of tambon Na Khu. There are a further five tambon administrative organizations (TAO).

References

External links
amphoe.com

Na Khu